Ecaterina Szabo (born 22 January 1967) is a former Romanian artistic gymnast who won 20 Olympic, world and continental medals.

Szabo won gold medals in the 1984 Olympics in three individual events (vault, balance beam (tie), and floor exercise), won the all-around silver medal, and contributed to the team gold. With her four gold medals and a silver medal, Szabo was the most successful athlete at the 1984 Summer Olympics. Afterwards, she led her team to the world title at the 1987 World Artistic Gymnastics Championships, defeating the USSR in the team competition for only the second time in the history of the competition. In 2000, Szabo was inducted into the International Gymnastics Hall of Fame.

Early life and career
An ethnic Hungarian from Transylvania, she was named Katalin, which was later changed  to Ecaterina by the Communists to try to hide her Hungarian background. Szabo's first language is Hungarian. She started gymnastics in 1973 at the Gymnastics School in Oneşti with coaches Maria Cosma and Mihai Agoston. Later she trained with Márta and Béla Károlyi. After the Károlyis' defection to the United States in 1981, she was coached by Adrian Goreac, Adrian Stan and Maria Cosma at Cetate Deva. She enjoyed tremendous success as a junior. Szabo became the first gymnast to win two Junior European all-around titles, competing against Lavinia Agache and Natalia Ilienko (in 1980) and Olga Mostepanova and Yelena Shushunova (in 1982). Individually, in 1980 she won gold on vault, beam and floor and placed fourth on uneven bars and in 1982 she won gold on vault and floor, silver on uneven bars and placed fourth on balance beam.

Senior career

1983
Szabo's first major international event was the 1983 European Championships in Goteborg. There she won gold on floor and uneven bars, silver on vault and bronze (tie) all around.
At the 1983 World Championships she placed third all around after Olga Mostepanova and Natalia Yurchenko. In this event she scored two perfect tens, one on floor and one on vault. In addition to her all around bronze she won gold on floor and silver on vault and uneven bars. She did not qualify for the beam finals. She also contributed heavily to the team silver medal by scoring perfect tens on floor and uneven bars in the team optional.

1984 Olympics

In response to the American-led boycott of the 1980 Summer Olympics in Moscow, 14 Eastern Bloc countries and allies including the Soviet Union, Cuba and East Germany (but not Romania) boycotted the Games. In the absence of the Soviet competitors, Szabo entered the competition as the favourite. Even with the Soviets competing, Szabo would have been a strong contender. While preparing for the Olympics, Szabo scored a perfect 40.0 for her compulsory exercises at a dual meet held in Czechoslovakia.
During the team section of the Olympic Games Szabo performed strongly, leading her team to their first Olympic title and qualifying second into the all-around (mainly due to a fall on bars in the team finals) and into three of the four event finals (vault, beam, and floor). Szabo was a heavy favorite to win to the all-around title and was dubbed "the next Nadia", after Nadia Comăneci. In the all-around competition, however, she lost the title by .05 to Mary Lou Retton and received the silver medal. Despite the second-place finish, she posted the highest cumulative score, which would have given her the title if the competition were held under the New Life rule. However, she had a strong comeback in the event finals, winning three gold medals on the three event finals she had qualified for; vault, beam and floor. Despite personal disappointment for not winning the all-around title, Szabo returned home to Romania a heroine. Later that year, she was elected the most successful athlete of the year in Romania.

After the 1984 Olympics
1985 was a disappointing year for the multiple Olympic champion. At the 1985 European Championships Szabo placed sixth on beam and floor, fifth all around and did not qualify in the uneven bars finals. However, she managed to win a silver medal on vault.  Later that year she had a similar showing at the 1985 World Championships; she placed fifth all around, fourth on floor, sixth on uneven bars. She left the competition with silver medals on beam, vault and with the team.
But in 1987, Szabo's hard work paid off. As a member of the tremendously successful Romanian team (five gold, one silver and four bronze) at the 1987 World Championships, Szabo and her teammates dealt a crushing defeat to the Soviets, winning the gold medal in the team event. Individually, she tied for bronze on beam with Svetlana Boginskaya and placed 14th all around.

Post-retirement
After the 1987 Worlds Szabo retired from artistic gymnastics and she went to study at the University of Physical and Sports Education in Bucharest. After graduation, she worked as a coach at Deva where she trained among others Nadia Haţegan, Andreea Cacovean, and the 1999 World Champion Maria Olaru. In June 1991, Szabo married Christian Tamas, a former member of Romania's kayak team. The two later had two sons named Lorenzo and Zeno. In 1992, the family left Romania and settled in Chamalieres, France where she now works as a coach.

In 2005, she was featured in a two-part documentary series titled Székely sportolók Kelettől Nyugatig (Székely Athletes from East to West). The 30-minute portrait film about Szabo was captioned A zágoni üstökös (The Comet of Zagon). A kindergarten in her hometown of Zagon, the Szabó Kati Óvoda, bears her name since 2007. In 2008, the sports hall of Sfântu Gheorghe was renamed in the honor of the four-time Olympic champion.

Skills
A strong all-arounder with artistic sensibilities, Szabo had a clean form in execution and was rewarded 17 scores of perfect ten between 1983 and 1984. Her skills included a tucked backward salto with a full twist on beam (e.g. 1982 Ennia Cup). On floor she performed difficult passes such as 1½ twist back salto to 1½ twist back salto, punch front or 1½ twist back salto to 1½ twist back salto, salto forward 1/2, punch front.
She also mounted floor exercise with a double back flip with a full twist in a piked position.  At the 1983 Worlds and 1984 Olympic Games Event Finals she also dismounted with a double back flip with a full twist in a tuck position which was unheard of.  Most gymnasts at the time did not even mount with this move.  This cemented the Olympic title in the Floor Exercise for her in which she received a perfect 10.0 for the exercise beating both Julianne McNamara and Mary Lou Retton for the gold medal.

Competitive history

See also

List of multiple Olympic gold medalists at a single Games
List of Olympic female gymnasts for Romania
List of top Olympic gymnastics medalists
List of top medalists at the World Artistic Gymnastics Championships

References

External links
 Whatever Happened to Ekaterina Szabo?
 List of competitive results at Gymn Forum
 Ecaterina Szabo profile at GymnStands
 
 
 
 

1967 births
Living people
People from Covasna County
Romanian female artistic gymnasts
Romanian sportspeople of Hungarian descent
Székely people
Olympic gymnasts of Romania
Olympic gold medalists for Romania
Olympic silver medalists for Romania
Olympic medalists in gymnastics
Gymnasts at the 1984 Summer Olympics
World champion gymnasts
Medalists at the World Artistic Gymnastics Championships
European champions in gymnastics
Medalists at the 1984 Summer Olympics